Events from the year 1639 in Denmark.

Incumbents 

 Monarch – Christian IV

Events

Undated 
 The Rosborg witch trials begin and continue until 1642.
 The first of the two Golden Horns of Gallehus is found. The second one will be found close by in 1734.

Births

Deaths 
 12 January – Reinhold Timm, painter
 5 February – Augusta of Denmark, princess (born 1580)
 9 April – Albret Skeel, nobleman (born 1572)
 6 August – Hans van Steenwinckel the Younger, architect (born 1587)
 1 October – Christen Friis, nobleman (born 1581)

References 

 
Denmark
Years of the 17th century in Denmark